was head of the Minamoto clan during his lifetime, and son of Minamoto no Yoshichika, son of Minamoto no Yoshiie. He led the Minamoto in the Hōgen Rebellion.

Though he was most famous for his involvement in the Hōgen Rebellion, Minamoto no Tameyoshi is also said to have intervened in a number of other conflicts earlier in his life. Around 1113, the ongoing rivalry between the warrior monks of Mii-dera and Enryaku-ji erupted into outright violence in the streets of Kyoto. Though the palace guard mobilized quickly to protect the Emperor, it is said that Tameyoshi, with a handful of mounted samurai, drove the mobs away himself.

Upon being defeated in the Hōgen Rebellion, Tameyoshi took the tonsure and was released into the custody of his son Minamoto no Yoshitomo who then had him beheaded.  This was an unprecedented breaking of Buddhist values in Japan, yet no one in the court berated Yoshitomo for his actions at the time until after his death.

Family
 Father: Minamoto no Yoshichika (? - 1108)
 Mother: Unknown
 Wife: Daughter of Fujiwara no Tadakiyo (藤原忠清の娘)
 1st son: Minamoto no Yoshitomo (源義朝, 1123–1160)
 2nd son: Minamoto no Tametomo (源為朝, 1139–1170)
 3rd son: Minamoto no Yukiie''' (源行家, 1143–1186)

See also
 Siege of Shirakawa-den

References

trans. Varley, Paul H. (1980). "A Chronicle of Gods and Sovereigns 'Jinnō Shōtōki' of Kitabatake Chikafusa". New York: Columbia University Press.

1096 births
1156 deaths
Minamoto clan
People of Heian-period Japan